is a Japanese multimedia franchise jointly created by Akira Itō, Satoshi Nakamura, Mitsuhisa Tamura, and Bushiroad president Takaaki Kidani. It currently consists of multiple anime television series, an official trading card game, a manga series, and an anime/live action film.

Anime 
In July 2010, an anime television series was green-lit by TMS Entertainment under the directorial supervision of Hatsuki Tsuji. Music is composed by Takayuki Negishi with character designs provided by Mari Tominaga. The series began airing in Japan on TV Aichi beginning on January 8, 2011, and rebroadcast by AT-X, TV Tokyo, TV Osaka, and TV Setouchi systems. The media-streaming website Crunchyroll simulcasted the first season to the United States, Canada, the United Kingdom, and Ireland. Crunchyroll began streaming the second season to the United States, Canada, and the United Kingdom on June 30, 2012 and continues to stream the series. It was announced on November 17, 2013, that Hanabee Entertainment has licensed the anime and released it on March 5, 2014, in Australia and New Zealand.

The series continued for three additional seasons: Cardfight!! Vanguard: Asia Circuit, which began airing on April 8, 2012; Cardfight!! Vanguard: Link Joker on January 13, 2013; and Cardfight!! Vanguard: Legion Mate on March 9, 2014. An anime/live action film was released on September 13, 2014, in Japan.

Cardfight!! Vanguard G ran from October 26, 2014, to October 5, 2015. It was followed by Cardfight!! Vanguard G: GIRS Crisis on October 11, 2015. Cardfight!! Vanguard G: Stride Gate aired from April 17, 2016, to September 25, 2016. It was followed by Cardfight!! Vanguard G: NEXT from October 2, 2016, to October 1, 2017, which OLM, Inc. started producing the series. It was followed by Cardfight!! Vanguard G: Z, which aired from October 8, 2017, to April 1, 2018. It is the last series in the original chronology as the next series Cardfight!! Vanguard (2018) is a reboot of the original series. The reboot started airing on May 5, 2018, and ended on May 4, 2019. It was followed by Cardfight!! Vanguard: High School Arc Cont. which aired from May 11, 2019, to August 10, 2019. A Bermuda Triangle spinoff series called Colorful Pastrale ~from Bermuda △~ which aired from January 12, 2019, to March 30, 2019. A prequel series  Cardfight!! Vanguard: Shinemon started airing on August 24, 2019. Cardfight!! Vanguard Gaiden if was originally scheduled to premiere on April 25, 2020. In April 2020, it was announced that the anime was delayed to May 30 due to the COVID-19 pandemic.

A new anime series Cardfight!! Vanguard overDress produced by Kinema Citrus, Wisp-o'-Animation, and Studio Jemi aired from April 3 to December 28, 2021.  A third and fourth season has been announced. The sequel series Cardfight!! Vanguard will+Dress premiered on July 5, 2022.  A second season will premiere in winter 2022, and a third season will premiere in summer 2023.

Plot 

Season 1

Aichi Sendou, the protagonist of the show, is a timid young boy in his third year of junior high school. The one thing that keeps him going is his trading card Blaster Blade from Cardfight!! Vanguard, a trading card game that takes place on a different planet called "Cray" and is popular throughout the world. When Aichi's Blaster Blade is stolen by his classmate Katsumi Morikawa, he chases him to a local card shop named Card Capital. There, Aichi has his first cardfight with Toshiki Kai, an aloof and cold-hearted high schooler who has outstanding abilities and who originally gave Aichi his Blaster Blade when Aichi was little. Aichi wins the fight, reclaiming Blaster Blade, and begins to enjoy a fulfilling life as he delves deeper into Vanguard. Aichi's primary goal throughout the series is to become a stronger fighter, so he can once again battle Kai and have him recognize his worth. Aichi eventually places high enough at a local tournament to join with Kai, Misaki Tokura, and Kamui Katsuragi to form Team Quadrifoglio ("Q4" for short). Together, they enter regional and national tournaments to test their skills against fighters from all over Japan. Aichi's principal rival becomes Ren Suzugamori, a powerful but despicable cardfighter who is the leader of the reigning national champion team. Ren eventually makes Aichi awaken a power that Ren also possesses: Psyqualia, a psychic-like ability that lets its user foresee victory in cardfights. However, Aichi's usage of Psyqualia slowly distorts him into becoming a dark person like Ren. Thanks to Kai's efforts, Aichi decides to no longer use Psyqualia and reverts to his normal self. When Aichi battles Ren at the finals of the national championships, it is revealed that Cray is real, and Psyqualia is the power given to those who will determine Cray's future. Aichi manages to reconcile his good-natured personality with his dark desires to become stronger. Simultaneously on Cray, the Royal Paladin characters depicted in Aichi's cards resolve their conflict with Ren's Shadow Paladins. Aichi defeats Ren, and Team Q4 becomes the national champions of Japan. The season concludes with Aichi's Psyqualia mysteriously vanishing and Kai fulfilling Aichi's wish to cardfight him again.

Season 2: Asia Circuit

Shortly after Q4 wins the national tournament, a strange phenomenon occurs when Aichi meets a young boy named Takuto Tatsunagi. The Royal Paladin, Shadow Paladin, and Kagero clans of Vanguard have been wiped from existence, and due to this, Aichi's Royal Paladin deck has been changed to Gold Paladin. Aichi reunites with Q4 (excluding Kai) and travels across Asia to participate in the Vanguard Fight Circuit, an invitational multi-stage tournament featuring the world's best cardfighters, for the opportunity to meet and seek answers from the sponsor, Takuto. Throughout the circuit, Aichi, whose Psyqualia has reactivated, encounters a mix of familiar friends and new rivals. One noteworthy rival is Team Dreadnought's Leon Soryu, a man possessing Psyqualia who is on a mission to lead the second coming of both his family and the long-lost Aqua Force clan. After losing at the Singapore, Seoul, and Hong Kong Stages of the VF Circuit, Q4 finally manages to win the Japan Stage and meet with Takuto, who reveals that a dark entity known as Void is currently threatening the planet Cray. Furthermore, Leon is exposed as having made an alliance with Void, allowing the three clans to be sealed away in exchange for Void's promise to return Aqua Force to power. In a final confrontation, Aichi defeats Leon, who had absorbed Void's power. With a reformed Leon's help, Aichi uses his Gold Paladins to drive Void out of Cray and subsequently free the captured clans. The VF Circuit concludes with Q4 crowned as the winning team. Afterward, life returns to normal, except that Aichi now has a new deck featuring his signature Royal Paladin units as Gold Paladins.

Season 3: Link Joker

Months have passed after the VF Circuit, and the members of Team Q4 have drifted apart. Aichi enters his first year of high school at Miyaji Academy, where the instructors and students focus on looking towards the future and studying. Aichi thinks Vanguard can be a future that people can believe in, and he tries to establish a Cardfight Club on campus. Despite the interference of the Student Council, he manages to recruit the requisite five members for the club: Kourin Tatsunagi, Naoki Ishida, Shingo Komoi, and Misaki, who is also a Miyaji Academy student but was reluctant to join the club. During Aichi's inaugural appearance at the VF High School Championship, his team defeats Kai's team but loses to Ren's team. Kai remarks on how much stronger both Aichi and Ren have become. The second major story arc of the season revolves around an extraterrestrial entity called "Link Joker", the clan which is the avatar of Void. Various fighters become corrupted by Void's power and turn into "Reversed" fighters driven to seek out stronger opponents and bring them under Void's influence. Kai visits Takuto to seek answers, and in a moment of weakness while cardfighting the Reversed Takuto, he allows himself to become Reversed in exchange for additional power. More and more cardfighters around the world become Reversed, including several of Aichi's friends. Although Ren and Leon manage to fend off and free their respective comrades from Reverse, Aichi is unaware of what is happening until he sees Reversed Takuto announcing the end of the world. At first hesitant to face his Reversed friends, especially Kai, Aichi eventually resolves himself to fight them to save the world. After many battles, Aichi and his friends emerge victorious over Link Joker, but at the cost of losing the original Takuto. Moreover, Aichi faces Kai in one last fight to decide the strongest fighter. In the end, Aichi wins after Kai realizes what a true friend Aichi has been for him.

Season 4: Legion Mate

Several days after the mortal battle against Link Joker, life seems to have returned to normal. However, Aichi Sendou, the hero who saved the earth from the invasion of Link Joker and Void, has disappeared, and Kai, his closest friend ("mate"), seems to be the only person who remembers him. After receiving a Royal Paladin deck containing a new version of Aichi's avatar card Blaster Blade, Kai sets out not only to remind everyone about Aichi but also find him. Kai manages to gather other comrades who remember Aichi: Naoki, Misaki, his classmate Miwa, and Kamui. However, Kai realizes that Kourin is also missing. His investigation leads to the discovery of four magically gifted cardfighters called the Quatre Knights: Olivier Gaillard, Phillip Neve, Rati Curti, and Raul Serra, who intend to stop anyone finding Aichi. Ren gives Kai a tip to Aichi's location where he discovers that Kourin is allied with the Quatre Knights, and Aichi was behind both the memory loss and the Quatre Knights. Kourin defeats Kai using her Link Joker deck and takes Blaster Blade. During training with Leon, Kai gains new resolve and returns to using a Kagero deck.

Naoki spies Serra's butler Morris entering a portal leading to a sanctuary on the moon where Aichi is located. Kai and his friends are confronted by Serra when they enter the sanctuary. They learn that in order to awaken Aichi they must defeat the four Quatre knights to break the four seals, but if they lose in the sanctuary they lose their memories of Aichi. Naoki defeats Serra, but Misaki, Kamui, and Miwa all lose to the three other Knights. With only Kai and Naoki remaining, Kai battles Gaillard, who blames Kai for the Link Joker incident and will not allow him to free Aichi because of it. Despite this, Kai defeats Gaillard, releasing the second seal. Suddenly, Serra arrives and uses his ice magic to imprison Kai, Naoki, and Gaillard. It is then that Gaillard reveals the truth; a Link Joker "seed" was implanted inside Aichi's body after he defeated Reversed Takuto. To contain the seed, Aichi now wants to seal himself away in the sanctuary with the Quatre Knights as his guardians. However, Serra reveals that his plan all along was to use Kai and his friends to weaken the seals, release the seed within Aichi, and obtain its power all for himself. Ren and Leon arrive and free Kai, Gaillard, and Naoki, but not before Serra has Neve fight Aichi while he battles Rati, releasing the remaining seals. Having discovered the meaning of "mates" thanks to Kai and Aichi, Gaillard finds new resolve and defeats Serra, stripping him of his powers and banishing him from the sanctuary. With Serra gone, Gaillard resets his sights towards Kai and fights him again. Kai defeats Gaillard again and then faces Aichi for a final battle. After Kai makes Aichi realize that sealing himself away was wrong, Kai defeats him. The Link Joker seed then tries to implant itself into Kai's body but is then broken apart by Blaster Blade. Nevertheless, the shattered pieces of the seed enter the bodies of each of Aichi's friends and will grow benign over time. Afterwards, Aichi, Kai, and the rest of their friends return to their normal lives. Aichi and Kai face each other in one last shop tournament, and despite the different paths they will take in the future, they know they will meet again as long as they keep playing Vanguard.

G Season 1

Set 3 years later after the events of Legion Mate, the story follows Chrono Shindou, an apathetic teenager who finds a Vanguard deck and a map in his school locker one day. Following the map, he is led to Card Capital 2, a card shop where he meets Kamui Katsuragi who works part-time there. After being taught how to play Vanguard and winning his first fight against Kamui, Chrono begins his venture in the world of Vanguard. Chrono finds Vanguard enjoyable, so he decides to return to Card Capital 2, where he takes up a quest and becomes a Grade 1 fighter. Then, he meets and fights Kouji Ibuki, who reveals that Chrono is and always has been completely alone. As a result, Ibuki crushes Chrono with no difficulty and refuses to even tell Chrono his name until Chrono becomes stronger. Over the next few days, Chrono meets and befriends Shion Kiba and Tokoha Anjou. Chrono also makes an acquaintance of Mamoru Anjou, the Kagero clan leader, and Jaime Alcaraz, the Spanish ace of the European League.

FIVA is holding a national tournament, and the only one not fired up is Tokoha. Being the younger sister of Mamoru, she is tired of being forced to live up to her brother's legacy. Meanwhile, Chrono is trying to get to Grade 3 so he can enter the tournament. In the end, Chrono, Shion, and Tokoha form Team TRY3 and enter the National Tournament together.

At the regional qualifier, Team TRY3 fights Team Demise. They ultimately turn out to be a formidable foe. Chrono beats their first fighter with no problems. Unfortunately, Shion and Tokoha ultimately lose in the second two games. In the aftermath of their defeat, Chrono's aunt discovers Chrono's new hobby and reveals the truth behind the disappearance of his father. Team TRY3 visits the United Sanctuary branch, seeking a rematch with Team Demise. They find that the United Sanctuary branch is turning fighters into people obsessed with victory, and challenge the Branch leader over the management of the United Sanctuary branch.

G Season 2: GIRS Crisis

This autumn will mark the opening of a major event organised by the Federation of International Vanguard Associations (FIVA), known as the "G Quest". Those who conquer the 6 Branch Quests will be honored with the title "Generation Master", and the chance to become a Clan Leader. The three members of TRY3 are all fired up by the new goal ahead of them, but behind the scenes, a massive plot that would lead to the destruction of Vanguard has been set in motion...

G Season 3: Stride Gate

Kouji Ibuki's Plan G is in effect, and they have located Ryuzu Myoujin's headquarters. It's up to Team TRY3 and their friends to stop Ryuzu's ambitions! However, Ryuzu has a defense force called the "Company", whose members include rival Shouma Shinonome and Am Chouno! What will happen to Luna Yumizuki after she was recognized as having more Stride Force than Am did? What will happen to Zodiac Time Beast if the Stride Gate will open? Will Vanguard be led to a perfect future?

The fight to save the Zodiac Time Beasts and Vanguard itself! The second part of Plan G is now in action!

G Season 4: NEXT

Five months have passed after Team TRY3's battle against the company and the team decided to split up and go their separate ways with all three of them enrolling to different high schools. The story focuses on Chrono Shindou transferring to Tokyo Metropolitan Harumi High School. Chrono forms a new team with Taiyou Asukawa and Kazuma Shouji, a gloomy boy who attends the same school as Chrono. Shion and Tokoha have formed their own teams as well. What new challenges await Chrono in the aftermath of all these changes?

G Season 5: Z

The final season of the G Series. A group of six units from Planet Cray, called the "Apostles", have invaded Earth. Armed with the power of the six Zeroth Dragons, the Apostles aim to revive the sealed Dragon Deity of Destruction, Gyze who attempted to destroy Cray in the past. The final battle between the Vanguards and the Dragon Deity of Destruction begins.

V series Season 1:

A reboot of the original Cardfight Vanguard with Aichi Sendou, the rest of Q4, and other returning characters from the original series.

V series Season 2: Shinemon Arc

Starting 15 years before the first V series season, this season focuses on Shinemon Nitta, the present manager of Card Capital, attempting to save the shop from becoming a branch of Cardshop: Esuka.

V series Season 3: Extra Story -IF-

The final season of the V Series. This series is where both IF continuity world Emi Sendou and her fairy companion Shuka and the V continuity Kouji Ibuki and Suiko Tatsunagi team up to fight against the Jammer to save her brother, Aichi Sendou who has become the enemy (similar to Legion Mate).

English dub 

An English dub co-produced by Ocean Productions (recorded at Blue Water Studios) began airing on Singapore's Okto channel from October 16, 2011, on Animax Asia from January 22, 2012, and on Malaysia's RTM-TV2 channel from November 18, 2012. Dubbed episodes also began being released on YouTube from May 29, 2012. The series can be seen officially on a dedicated channel for it created by Bushiroad, and is available for viewing in most countries without "geo-blocking" and some opening and ending themes are replaced with an English version of an available opening and ending theme due to copyright. An English dub of the fifth season G began airing on YouTube on January 3, 2015, thus skipping over the fourth season Legion Mate. Hulu began hosting the English-dubbed version on August 26, 2013, in partnership with Aniplex of America.

Theme music

Cardfight Vanguard!!
Opening themes
"Vanguard" by JAM Project (eps. 1–33, eps. 1–65 in English dub)
"Believe In My Existence" by JAM Project (eps. 34–65)
"Limit Break" by JAM Project (eps. 66–104)
"Vanguard Fight" by Psychic Lover (eps. 105–128, eps. 105–163 in English dub)
 by DAIGO (eps. 129–148)
"Break your spell" by Psychic Lover (eps. 149–163)
"V-ROAD" by BUSHI★7 (Daigo, Psychic Lover, Suzuko Mimori, Izumi Kitta, Suara, and Shūta Morishima) (eps. 164–179)
"KNOCK ON YOUR GATE!" by Masatoshi Ono (eps. 180–196)
Ending themes
 by Natsuko Aso (eps. 1–15)
"Smash Up!!" by Shīna Hekīru (eps. 16–25)
"Dream Shooter" by Sea☆A (eps. 25–38, eps. 1–65 in English dub)
"Starting Again" by Sayaka Sasaki (eps. 39–52)
 by Saori Kodama featuring Milky Holmes (Suzuko Mimori, Izumi Kitta, Sora Tokui, and Mikoi Sasaki) (eps. 53–65)
 by Rin (eps. 66–78)
"Fighting Growing Diary" by Natsuko Aso (eps. 79–91)
"Entry!" by Sea☆A (eps. 92–104)
"Endless☆Fighter" by Suzuko Mimori, Yoshino Nanjō, and Aimi Terakawa (eps. 105–119, eps. 105–163 in English dub)
"Yume Yume Express" by Milky Holmes (Suzuko Mimori, Izumi Kitta, Sora Tokui, and Mikoi Sasaki) (eps. 120–138)
"Ride on fight!" by (Izumi Kitta and Suzuko Mimori) (eps. 139–150)
 by Suara (eps. 151–163)
"Get Up" by FAKY (eps. 164–179)
"Get back yourself" by CERASUS (eps. 180–196)

Insert songs
 by Ultra Rare (Mimori, Nanjō, and Terakawa) (eps. 18, 26, and 115; simply known as "Miracle Trigger" in English dub)
 by Ultra Rare (Mimori, Nanjō, and Terakawa) (eps. 39, 115, and 118)
English dub ending theme
"Way To Victory" by Sea☆A (eps. 66–104 in English dub)

Cardfight Vanguard!! G
Opening themes
"BREAK IT!" by Mamoru Miyano (eps. 1–26, eps. 1–98 in English version)
"Generation!" by JAM Project (eps. 27–48)
"YAIBA" by BREAKERZ (eps. 49–74)
"SHOUT!" by Mamoru Miyano (eps. 75–98)
"Hello, Mr. Wonder land" by Ayako Nanakomori (eps. 99–123, eps. 99–current in English version)
"→Next Generation" by Psychic Lover (eps. 124–150)
" by Kiryu (eps. 151–174)

Ending themes
 by Izumi Kitta (eps. 1–13, eps. 1–48 in English dub)
"NEXT PHASE" by Emi Nitta (eps. 14–26)
"flower" by Ayako Nanakomori (eps. 27–36)
 by Starmarie (eps. 37–48)
"Don't Look Back" by Rummy Labyrinth (Aimi Terakawa & Haruka Kudō) (eps. 49–74, eps. 49–98 in English dub)
"High Touch☆Memory" by Yui Ogura (eps. 75–86)
"Promise You!!" by YuiKaori (eps. 87–98)
"Wing of Image" by Rummy Labyrinth (eps. 99–111, eps. 99–current in English dub)
"Are you ready to FIGHT" by Raychell (eps. 112–123)
"Pleasure Stride" by Milky Holmes (eps. 124–136)
"Natsuninare" by Starmarie (eps. 137–150)
"Heroic Advent" by Roselia (eps. 151–174)

Trading Card Game 

An official card game by Bushiroad was released on February 26, 2010. The English release of the game was first produced in Singapore on May 5, 2010. It has continued to be released internationally since May 12, 2010.

Gameplay 
The basic premise of the trading card game, as explained in the anime, is that the two players represent "astral spirits" duelling on the fictional planet Cray. The cards in the players' decks, called "Units", represent characters from Cray that players can "Call" to the field to fight for them. Players alternate turns calling, attacking, and defending with units.

Product information 
Vanguard cards are sold in Booster Sets, Extra Boosters, and Trial Decks, each containing a selection of new cards and occasionally reprints. A typical booster pack contains five cards: four common (C) cards and one rare (R) or higher, such as a double rare (RR), triple rare (RRR), or Special Parallel (SP). SP cards are alternate versions of lower-rarity cards in the same set, but have different flavor text and sometimes artwork. Cards of R rarity or higher also have special holographic foiling patterns, which vary depending on set and rarity.

Other media

Manga 
A manga series written and illustrated by Akira Itō was announced along with the anime. The first chapter was published on November 26, 2010, in Kerokero Ace magazine. With Kerokero Ace ceasing publication with its September 2013 issue, new chapters of the manga continued starting with the first issue of Monthly Bushiroad magazine. While the manga shares the same characters as the anime, it follows an original storyline and contains many differences from the anime version. Vertical has licensed the manga series and began releasing it in North America on April 29, 2014.

A side story referred as Episode 0 was released on May 23, 2013. It is also illustrated by Itō. Its storyline follows Toshiki Kai's childhood.

Spin-offs 
The first chapter of the spinoff was released with the sixth chapter of the main manga series. Mini Vanguard is a short yonkoma comedy manga by Quily featuring all of the characters as super deformed. Like the original manga series, Mini Vanguard continued in the first issue of Monthly Bushiroad magazine after the final September 2013 issue of Kerokero Ace magazine. Mini Vanguard was adapted into a flash anime series produced by DLE. It aired from April 6, 2013, to December 14, 2013. The ending theme song of this series is "Mirai Sketch" by Ultra Rare (Suzuko Mimori, Yoshino Nanjō, and Aimi Terakawa).

Another spin-off manga series titled  began publishing in Monthly Bushiroad magazine. It is supervised by Akira Itō and illustrated by Makoto Kishimizu. Its story focuses on the lore of the Cardfight!! Vanguard trading card game.

Radio show 
A talk radio show titled , also known as TachiVan, began airing in 2011 on Hibiki Radio. It is currently split into two shows: the main show which changes its subtitle to coincide with the current anime season and airs on Saturdays, and TachiVan Sunday. It is hosted by Tsubasa Yonaga and Takuya Satō, the voice actors of Aichi and Kai respectively, with occasional guest appearances by various other Japanese voice actors and actresses from the anime series.

Novel 
A 224-page novel based on the anime series was released in Japan on May 15, 2013. It is written by Bandana Aoi, and the internal illustrations are done by Yōsuke Adachi. The story follows Aichi reaching out to a lonely young boy named .

Video games 
A mobile app game titled  was released on March 12, 2013. It is a strategy role-playing game and is region-locked to prevent devices outside Japan from installing it.

A Nintendo 3DS video game adaption titled  was released in Japan on April 11, 2013. It was developed by FuRyu. The game features an original story which stars a new cardfighter protagonist who is aiming to win at a national tournament. Players choose one of six possible original characters to play as, one male and one female each of three personality types: hot-blooded (熱血系), cool (クール), and dark (ダーク).

A second 3DS game adaption titled  was released in Japan on June 5, 2014, also developed by FuRyu. This game's story is based on the Link Joker arc of the anime series.

A downloadable game for Microsoft Windows titled Cardfight!! Online was planned to be released in early 2016, but cancelled. It was developed by DELiGHTWORKS and CrossGames. The game was intended to be free-to-play with in-game transactions.

On January 14, 2016,  was released for Nintendo 3DS.

A video game for Nintendo Switch titled  was released on September 19, 2019, in Japan.

A mobile app titled Cardfight!! Vanguard Zero was released globally on April 9, 2020. Many mechanics from the original card game have been changed in favor of fast game play over full simulation.

On November 17, 2022, A video game titled Cardfight!! Vanguard Dear Days was released for Nintendo Switch and PC. It is the first title to be translated and released outside of Japan, and was also developed by FuRyu. It was also the first Switch game to go above the initial price for the base game.

Live-action drama 
A live-action 90-minute drama titled Stand Up! Vanguard was aired on May 3, 2012. It is directed by Takashi Motoki, who describes this project as the "first-ever live-action card-game program". It stars Daigo, Shinta Sōma, Haruki Uchiyama, Suzuko Mimori, Nao Nagasawa, Kazuki Namioka, and Kazuhiko Kanayama. Two of Breakerz's songs, "Climber x Climber" and "Nonai Survivor", are used as background music for this drama as well as some live-action Cardfight!! Vanguard commercials. Much like in the anime, this drama features cameo appearances of the main characters of Tantei Opera Milky Holmes. In this case, three girls cosplay as Nero, Cordelia, and Hercule as one of the teams in the Vanguard team tournament.

Daigo is a wanderer who claims to be a genius and strongly believes in justice. One day, at a playground, he sees Hiroki Miura being bullied by other kids, including his classmate Teru Minamihara. Daigo attempts to save the day, but he gets beaten up in Hiroki's place. The kids' homeroom teacher, Maria Kagami, arrives to the scene and scares the bullies away. As Hiroki walks back home, Maria explains to Daigo about how Hiroki is a timid boy who never speaks his mind, which has warranted him to be picked on. To help Hiroki (and win Maria's affection), Daigo gets a job as a special teacher at the school. As Daigo tries to get closer to Hiroki, he learns that while Hiroki may be reserved, he is actually passionate about and confident in himself when it comes to playing the game of Cardfight!! Vanguard. Little by little, as Daigo has Hiroki teach him more about the game, he opens up Hiroki's heart while teaching him to have courage. However, he also learns that several factors all inhibit Hiroki from coming out of his shell: Hiroki has a fear of losing, Hiroki's busy working father Shigehiro looks down on his hobby, and Hiroki's mother Kumiko, who got him into playing Vanguard, is deceased. Eventually, Daigo convinces Hiroki to play against Teru in a cardfight. However, Teru wins and insults Hiroki, causing him to lock himself in his room out of frustration. Daigo tries to have a match with Teru but instead finds himself challenging Teru's supremacist home tutor and a greater genius, Eiji Satomi. He ends up losing to Eiji multiple times, with Hiroki secretly watching. Hiroki asks Daigo why he tries so hard, to which Daigo answers "losing is frustrating, but what comes after is most important."

Hiroki declares to Teru that he will get his revenge at a citywide Vanguard team tournament. The tournament commences with Hiroki, Daigo, and Maria teaming up. Defeating many colorful teams along the way, both Hiroki's and Teru's teams advance to the finals, which are to be held the next day. However, the night before the tournament finals, Maria gets hit by a car and is hospitalized as a result. With no one else to turn to, Daigo asks Shigehiro to be Maria's replacement, but he refuses due to his work. The next day, despite Hiroki not believing his father would come, Shigehiro does in fact make it in time before Hiroki's team gets disqualified. The finals begin with Shigehiro using his deceased wife Kumiko's deck against one of Teru's team members. Although Shigehiro ends up losing, he remembers the last conversation he had with Kumiko before she died. After the fight, he apologizes to Hiroki for all the mean things he said and gives him Kumiko's necklace, telling him to have courage. With Teru's team leading 1–0, the next fight between Daigo and Eiji starts. Despite Eiji's genius-level play, Daigo refuses to give up. He miraculously defeats Eiji, who runs away crying. With the score now 1-1, it comes down to the last match between Hiroki and Teru. Although Hiroki tries his absolute best and never gives up, Teru ultimately wins. Hiroki, Shigehiro, and Daigo all cry in frustration, but during the awards ceremony, Teru recognizes Hiroki and gives him his respect and friendship. Afterwards, when Daigo goes to the hospital to give flowers to the injured Maria, he sees her with another man, assuming that he is Maria's significant other. Believing that his love for Maria is over before it started, he runs off. In the end, Hiroki is now more confident in himself and has many friends. Daigo decides to go back to being a wanderer, but not before he and Hiroki have one last cardfight.

Live-action/anime film 
A hybrid live-action/anime film was released on September 13, 2014. The live-action segment, was directed by Takashi Motoki at Ace Crew Entertainment, and stars Daigo, Suzuko Mimori, Taizō Shīna, Takuma Sueno, and others. The anime portion, was directed by Shin Itagaki at Ultra Super Pictures, and screenplay was made by Mayori Sekijima. It features the animated debut of the character Kouji Ibuki (voiced by Mamoru Miyano). Neon Messiah made its US premiere on July 4, 2015, at Anime Expo.

Reception 
In its Winter 2011 Anime Preview Guide, the staff of Anime News Network had a poor impression of the anime series. Carl Kimlinger complained about the crass commercialism of the trading card game shows and was glad that the series (in his view) flopped. Carlo Santos and Bamboo Dong gave equally scathing reviews. Chris Beveridge of Mania.com compares the series with other trading card game based shows such as Yu-Gi-Oh! and states that, while he sees many kids using the series to take notes and getting their game plan, he feels the series still needs to work on being engaging and entertaining.

As for the trading card game, it has received praise for its marketing through the animated television show and various media, which has caused its popularity to rise immensely. On December 14, 2012, the company Interface in Design created a survey for which trading card game had the most fulfilling playing experience for the "Trading Card Game Award of 2012". Cardfight!! Vanguard was bestowed awards for the most excellent game in both Elementary School and General categories. It also received honorable mentions under the Junior High School, High School, and Adult categories. These awards were bestowed to Cardfight!! Vanguard due to the high praise the game received for its tournament events and ease of access to important updates in the Vanguard culture through magazines and websites. The ease of learning the game for new players was also an incredibly appealing aspect of the game.

References

External links 
 
 

 
2011 anime television series debuts
2012 anime television series debuts
2013 anime television series debuts
2014 anime television series debuts
2015 anime television series debuts
2016 anime television series debuts
2017 anime television series debuts
2018 anime television series debuts
2019 anime television series debuts
2020 anime television series debuts
2021 anime television series debuts
Japanese children's animated action television series
Japanese children's animated adventure television series
Japanese children's animated science fantasy television series
Bushiroad
Card games in anime and manga
Card games introduced in 2011
Collectible card games
Crunchyroll anime
Funimation
Kadokawa Shoten manga
Kinema Citrus
OLM, Inc.
Sentai Filmworks
Shōnen manga
TMS Entertainment
TV Tokyo original programming
Tokyo MX original programming
Vertical (publisher) titles
Anime postponed due to the COVID-19 pandemic